Abderrafi Gassi (born 27 October 1972) is a Moroccan footballer. He played in four matches for the Morocco national football team in 2000 and 2002. He was also named in Morocco's squad for the 2000 African Cup of Nations tournament.

References

1972 births
Living people
Moroccan footballers
Morocco international footballers
2000 African Cup of Nations players
Place of birth missing (living people)
Association footballers not categorized by position